The Long March 2A, also known as the Chang Zheng 2A, CZ-2A and LM-2A, was a Chinese orbital carrier rocket which launched FSW-0 reconnaissance satellites. It was later replaced by the more capable Long March 4C. It was developed by the China Academy of Launch Vehicle Technology (CALT).

It launched from Launch Area 2B at the Jiuquan Satellite Launch Centre in China. It was a 2-stage rocket which flew 4 times. On its first flight on 5 November 1974, a cable connecting the pitch rate control gyroscope to the guidance system became disconnected, resulting in a loss of control and launch failure.

List of launches

References

Long March (rocket family)
Vehicles introduced in 1974